Gavrolimni is a village and a community in Aetolia-Acarnania, western Greece, part of the municipality of Nafpaktia. According to the 2011 census, the village had 187 inhabitants.

Geography
Gavrolimni lies at about 100 meters elevation, at the foot of the hill Kaliakouda, between the mountains Klokova and Varasova. Further north is the Evinos river. It lies 13 km northwest of Antirrio, 18 km west of Nafpaktos and 18 km east of Messolonghi. The Greek National Road 5 (Patras-Antirrio-Agrinio-Ioannina) runs through the southern part of the village. The Motorway 5 passes south of the village. 2 km north of the village, in a valley where pine trees, olive trees and cypresses grow, lies the late 10th century monastery of Panagia Panaxiotissa.

History
After the Greek War of Independence, Gavrolimni became part of independent Greece. In 1841 it became part of the municipality of Nafpaktos. Between 1912 and 1994 it was an independent community. In 1994, the village became part of the municipality of Chalkeia. In 2011, it became part of the municipality of Nafpaktia.

Historical population

References

Populated places in Aetolia-Acarnania
Nafpaktia